An-Nabek or Al-Nabek is a Syrian city administratively belonging to Rif Dimashq and the capital of the Qalamoun. It has an altitude of 1255 meters. According to the Syria Central Bureau of Statistics (CBS), An-Nabek had a population of 32,548 in the 2004 census. The Monastery of Saint Moses the Abyssinian (Deir Mar Musa al-Habashi) is located along the Anti-Lebanon Mountains near Nabek and dates back to at least the 6th century.

In the mid-19th century, the population was recorded as consisting mostly of Sunni Muslims, Syriac Catholic and Melkite Catholic Christians. In the mid-1940s, its 6,000 inhabitants were noted to be Sunni Muslims.

History
An-Nabek has been mentioned by Arab geographers from the 12th to 13th centuries CE. Ibn Jubayr recorded that it was a village north of Damascus "with much running water and broad arable fields." Yaqut al-Hamawi wrote in 1225 that "is a fine village with excellent provisions... There is here a curious spring which runs cold in the summer, and with clear, excellent water. They say its source is at Yabroud." During the Syrian Civil War the town and surrounding area came under the influence of rebel fighters in an area that spilled over into Lebanon. This pocket was later liquidated by Syrian and Hezbollah troops in the Qalamoun offensive (July–August 2017), with many rebel fighters surrendering to government troops.

Landmarks
Deir Mar Musa al-Habashi, the monastery of Monastery of Saint Moses the Abyssinian, sits above the town to the east.

References

Bibliography

External links
Al Nabk.net
Al Nabk.com
4nabk.com

Cities in Syria
Populated places in An-Nabek District
Christian communities in Syria